In mathematics and probability, the Borell–TIS inequality is a result bounding the probability of a deviation of the uniform norm of a centered Gaussian stochastic process above its expected value.  The result is named for Christer Borell and its independent discoverers Boris Tsirelson, Ildar Ibragimov, and Vladimir Sudakov.  The inequality has been described as "the single most important tool in the study of Gaussian processes."

Statement

almost surely finite, and let

Another related statement which is also known as the Borell-TIS inequality is that, under the same conditions as above, 
,
and so by symmetry
.

See also 
 Gaussian isoperimetric inequality

References

Probabilistic inequalities